The BBSome is an octameric protein complex. It is a component of the basal body and is involved in trafficking cargos to the primary cilium. The BBSome is a complex of seven Bardet–Biedl syndrome (BBS) proteins: BBS1, BBS2, BBS4, BBS5, BBS7, BBS8 and BBS9. In addition the BBSome contains the BBIP10 protein. Mutation in each of this eight BBSome genes (as well as other 14 BBS genes identified to date ) causes a severe multiorganic syndrome (BBS) presenting in most cases by retinal dystrophy, obesity, renal anomalies, post-axial polydactyly, and developmental delay.

History
The BBSome was first identified in 2007 by Peter K. Jackson and colleagues.

Assembly

BBSome assembly has been shown to be mediated by a complex containing a further three BBS proteins: BBS6, BBS10 and BBS12. In addition chaperonins of the CCT/TRiC family are involved.

References

 Loktev, A.V., Q. Zhang, J. S. Beck, C. C. Searby, T. E. Scheetz, J. F. Bazan, D. C. Slusarski, V. C. Sheffield, P. K. Jackson, M. V. Nachury (2008). A BBSome subunit links ciliogenesis, microtubule stability, and acetylation.  Developmental Cell 2008 15:854-65.

Organelles